The 1989 NFL season was the 70th regular season of the National Football League. Before the season, NFL commissioner Pete Rozelle announced his retirement. Paul Tagliabue was eventually chosen to succeed him, taking over on November 5.

Due to damage caused by the Loma Prieta earthquake to Candlestick Park, the New England Patriots at San Francisco 49ers game on October 22 was played at Stanford Stadium in Stanford.

The season ended with Super Bowl XXIV where the 49ers defeated the Denver Broncos 55–10 at the Louisiana Superdome.

Player movement

Transactions
March 27: The Kansas City Chiefs sign Defensive Tackle Dan Saleaumua as a free agent.
March 28: The Washington Redskins sign Tight End Ken Whisenhunt as a free agent. Whisenhunt would become an NFL head coach, leading the Arizona Cardinals to an appearance in Super Bowl XLIII. 
March 31: The San Francisco 49ers sign Wide Receiver Mike Sherrard as a free agent.
April 13: The Tampa Bay Buccaneers sign Kicker John Carney as a free agent.
June 13: The 49ers sign quarterback Steve Bono as a free agent.

Trades
 May 30, 1989: The Phoenix Cardinals traded David Treadwell to the Denver Broncos.
 June 5, 1989: The Dallas Cowboys traded Steve DeOssie to the New York Giants.
August 7: The Dallas Cowboys trade quarterback Scott Secules to the Miami Dolphins. 
August 18: The Chicago Bears trade quarterback Jim McMahon to the San Diego Chargers
August 30: The San Diego Chargers trade punter Ralf Mojsiejenko to Washington 
September 4: The New York Jets trade center Guy Bingham to the Atlanta Falcons.
September 6: The Tampa Bay Buccaneers trade defensive end Ron Holmes to the Denver Broncos

 October 12, 1989: the Cowboys traded Herschel Walker to the Minnesota Vikings for a total of five players (LB Jesse Solomon, DB Issiac Holt, RB Darrin Nelson, LB David Howard, DE Alex Stewart) and six draft picks (which led to Emmitt Smith, Russell Maryland, Kevin Smith, and Darren Woodson). Scout.com says "Walker was never used properly by the coaching brain trust (a total oxymoron in this case)".

Draft

The 1989 NFL Draft was held from April 23 to 24, 1989 at New York City's Marriott Marquis. With the first pick, the Dallas Cowboys selected quarterback Troy Aikman from the University of California, Los Angeles. Selecting third, the Detroit Lions drafted Barry Sanders, who would retire as the NFL's second all-time leading scorer (since broken).

Referee changes
Fred Silva retired during the 1989 off-season. He joined the NFL in 1968 as a line judge before being promoted to referee in 1969. Games that he officiated include Super Bowl XIV and the Freezer Bowl. 

Dale Hamer, the head linesman for Super Bowl XVII and Super Bowl XXII, and Howard Roe were promoted to referee. In addition to replacing Silva, an extra 16th officiating crew was added to help handle the weekly workload of 14 games.

Walt Coleman was hired as a line judge. He was promoted to referee in 1995 and was a crew chief through 2018.

Major rule changes
After a foul that occurs inside the last two minutes of the first half and inside the last five minutes of the second half or overtime, the game clock will start at the snap, instead of when the ball is spotted and the referee signals it is ready to be played.
New rules were enacted, including loss of timeouts or five-yard penalties, to handle the problem of crowd noise when it becomes too loud for the offensive team to hear its signals.
If a receiver and a defender eventually establish joint control of a pass, the ball will be awarded to whoever was the first player to establish control of the ball.
While not a rule “change” per se, the “hurry up offense” was recognized as fully legal, and penalties for delay of game would be called against teams whose defenders faked injuries in order to slow down the tempo, unless those teams called for timeouts.

1989 deaths
Jim Lansford died on January 17, 1989.
Charley Long: A member of the Patriots' All-1960s (AFL) Team, Long died on December 16, 1989.
John Matuszak: On June 17, Matuszak, a member of the Oakland Raiders Super Bowl XI and Super Bowl XV championship teams, died of an accidental propoxyphene overdose.
Carl Monroe: On April 26, 1989, Monroe, a member of the San Francisco 49ers Super Bowl XIX championship team, was found dead at his home at 7:58 A.M.
Steve Moore: Moore, a New England Patriots 1983 NFL Draft selection, was shot and killed in October 1989, following a robbery outside a convenience store in Memphis.
Wayne Moore: A member of the 1972 Miami Dolphins Super Bowl VII championship team; Moore suffered a heart attack at his home in Miami on August 19, 1989 and was pronounced dead at Coral Reef Hospital that afternoon.
Sherman Plunkett: A member of the Baltimore Colts' NFL championship teams in 1958 and 1959, Plunkett died on November 18, 1989.
Frank Sinkovitz: Having served as an NFL umpire from 1958 to 1983, Sinkovitz also played for the Pittsburgh Steelers from 1947 to 1952. An official for Super Bowl XV, he died on August 6, 1989.
Stumpy Thomason: A former quarterback for the Philadelphia Eagles, Thomas died on April 30, 1989.
Tommy Thompson: A quarterback for the Pittsburgh Steelers and Philadelphia Eagles during the World War II era, died on April 22, 1989.
Chuck Tollefson: A member of the Green Bay Packers 1944 NFL Championship Game team, Tollefson died on August 20, 1989.
Stacey Toran
Ossie Wiberg: Having played in 44 NFL games between 1927 and 1932, Wiberg died on August 14, 1989.
On November 24, Atlanta Falcons offensive tackle Ralph Norwood was killed in an automobile accident eight miles from the Falcons’ training facilities.
On December 19, Falcons backup tight end Brad Beckman was also killed in an auto accident.

Preseason

American Bowl
A series of National Football League pre-season exhibition games that were held at sites outside the United States, a pair of games in 1989 were contested in London, England and Tokyo, Japan.

Hall of Fame Game
The Pro Football Hall of Fame Game, in which the Washington Redskins defeated the Buffalo Bills 31–6, was played on August 5, televised nationally by ABC and held at Fawcett Stadium in Canton, Ohio, the same city where the league was founded. The 1989 Hall of Fame Class included Mel Blount and Terry Bradshaw, teammates on four Super Bowl championship teams with the Pittsburgh Steelers in the 1970s, Art Shell, a member of the Oakland Raiders Super Bowl XI and Super Bowl XV teams, plus Willie Wood, who captured five NFL championships, including Super Bowl I and Super Bowl II with the Green Bay Packers.

Regular season

Scheduling formula

Highlights of the 1989 season included:
Thanksgiving: Two games were played on Thursday, November 23, featuring Cleveland at Detroit and Philadelphia at Dallas, with Detroit and Philadelphia winning. 
Christmas: For the first time, regular season game was held on Christmas Day, as the Cincinnati Bengals visited the Minnesota Vikings, for a 9 p.m. ET Monday Night Football contest on ABC. The Vikings emerged victorious in the contest, which eliminated the Bengals from playoff contention. Coincidentally, the Vikings also had played in the first playoff game on Christmas, a 1971 loss to the eventual Super Bowl VI champion Dallas Cowboys.

Final standings

Tiebreakers
Indianapolis finished ahead of Miami in the AFC East based on better conference record (7–5 vs. Dolphins' 6–8).
Houston finished ahead of Pittsburgh in the AFC Central based on head-to-head sweep (2–0).
Philadelphia was first NFC Wild Card ahead of L.A. Rams based on better record against common opponents (7–3 to Rams' 5–4).
Minnesota finished ahead of Green Bay in the NFC Central based on better division record (6–2 vs. Packers' 5–3).

Playoffs

Statistical leaders

Team

Awards

Coaching changes

Offseason
Cleveland Browns: Marty Schottenheimer left the Browns to coach the Kansas City Chiefs. The Browns turned to Bud Carson to replace Schottenheimer. 
Dallas Cowboys: In a highly publicized move shortly after taking over, the Cowboys' new ownership fired Tom Landry, the team's only head coach in franchise history. Jimmy Johnson, who lead the Miami Hurricanes to a college football national championship in 1987, was named as Landry's replacement.
Detroit Lions: Wayne Fontes began his first full season as head coach after replacing Darryl Rogers, who was fired after 11 games in 1988.
Kansas City Chiefs: Frank Gansz was fired. Marty Schottenheimer then joined the Chiefs after leaving the Browns.
San Diego Chargers: Al Saunders was replaced by Dan Henning.
San Francisco 49ers: Bill Walsh retired after the team's 1988 NFL/Super Bowl championship. Defensive coordinator George Seifert was promoted to head coach.

In-season
Atlanta Falcons: Marion Campbell's second tenure with the Falcons ended when he was fired after the first 12 games, and former St. Louis Cardinals coach Jim Hanifan served as interim for the final four games.
Los Angeles Raiders: Mike Shanahan was fired after the first four games. Assistant coach Art Shell served as interim for the last 12 games. Shell was given the position permanently and held it through 1994, then returned for one season in 2006.
Phoenix Cardinals: Gene Stallings was fired after the first 11 games after announcing he would resign at the end of the season, and Hank Kuhlmann served as interim for the final five games. Stallings became coach of the Alabama Crimson Tide, where he won the 1992 national championship.

Uniform changes
 The Dallas Cowboys removed the elliptical blue circles with the player's number from the hip area of the pants
 The Green Bay Packers removed the helmet monogram from their jersey sleeves
 The Kansas City Chiefs began wearing their white pants with their white jerseys, discontinuing their red pants. It was the first time the Chiefs wore white pants with their white jerseys since 1967. The red pants returned in 2000.
 The Miami Dolphins introduced aqua pants to be worn with their white jerseys. They were not worn again in 1989 after a 39-7 loss at Houston in week four, but returned full-time in 1990. 
 The Phoenix Cardinals added the flag of Arizona on top of the sleeve stripes of their white jerseys

Television
This was the third and final year under the league's broadcast contracts with ABC, CBS, NBC, and ESPN to televise Monday Night Football, the NFC package, the AFC package, and Sunday Night Football, respectively. O. J. Simpson was named as the sole studio analyst for NBC's NFL Live!, joining host Bob Costas. NBC also hired the then-recently retired head coach Bill Walsh to join Dick Enberg on the network's lead broadcast team, replacing Merlin Olsen as the network's lead color commentator.

References

NFL Record and Fact Book
NFL History 1981–1990  (Last accessed December 4, 2005)
Total Football: The Official Encyclopedia of the National Football League

1989
 
National Football League